The Football NSW 2010 season was the top flight football competition format in New South Wales. The competition consisted of four divisions across the State of New South Wales.

League Tables

2010 NSW Premier League

The 2010 NSW Premier League season was played over 22 rounds, beginning on 27 February with the regular season concluding on 1 August 2010.

2010 NSW Super League

The 2010 NSW Super League season was played over 22 rounds, beginning on 20 March with the regular season concluding on 15 August 2010.

NB Two matches were postponed and subsequently couldn't be played.

2010 NSW State League Division 1

The 2010 NSW State League Division 1 season was played over 22 rounds, beginning on 20 March with the regular season concluding on 15 August 2010.

2010 NSW State League Division 2

The 2010 NSW State League Division 2 season was played over 22 rounds, beginning on 20 March with the regular season concluding on 22 August 2010.

References

2010 in Australian soccer